Hadromys is a genus of rodent in the family Muridae endemic to Asia. It contains the following species:
 Manipur bush rat (Hadromys humei)
 †Hadromys loujacobsi
 Yunnan bush rat (Hadromys yunnanensis)

References

 
Rodent genera
Taxa named by Oldfield Thomas
Taxonomy articles created by Polbot